Karen Leanne Webb,  is an Australian police officer, who replaced Mick Fuller as the Commissioner of the New South Wales Police Force in February 2022. Webb is the first woman appointed to this office.

Early life and career 
Webb was born and raised in Boorowa in the south western slopes of New South Wales, and attended Boorowa Central School.

Webb joined NSW Police in 1987 and previously was responsible for traffic and highway patrol and public transport. She joined the Castle Hill Police Station, in the 1990s at a time when 10% of police officers were women, and grew to 35% as at 2021. She later stated in 2021 that she "look forward to growing our diversity and inclusion in the organisation". Webb was the first woman to lead Traffic and Highway Patrol, since 2020. She was promoted in 2017 to assistant commissioner, and subsequently moved to deputy commissioner in July 2021. She has been a Board Member of NSW Police Legacy since 2018, and Vice-Patron since 2022.

On 1 February 2022, Webb was formally appointed as Commissioner of the New South Wales Police Force. Previous police commissioner ceremonies were traditionally held at Government House in Sydney, but Webb chose to accept her appointment in her alma mater at Boorowa Central School.

Honours and achievements
Webb was awarded the Australian Police Medal in the 2015 Australia Day Honours.

References

Living people
Australian police officers
Recipients of the Australian Police Medal
Year of birth missing (living people)